Belle Monappa Hegde (born 18 August 1938) is a cardiologist, professor of medicine, and author. He was the Vice Chancellor of Manipal Academy of Higher Education from 1999 to 2003. He was awarded Padma Bhushan in 2010 and Padma Vibhushan in 2021. He has supported theories of homeopathy and quantum healing.

Early life 
Hegde was born on 18 August 1938 in Pangala near Udupi, Karnataka, India He obtained MBBS from Stanley Medical College, Madras in 1960 and later M.D. from King George Medical College, Lucknow

Career 
Over a long career at Kasturba Medical College, Mangalore, Hegde served in various positions such as Professor, Principal and Dean. He was appointed the Vice Chancellor of Manipal Academy of Higher Education in 1999 and served till 2003. He was an Independent Director of Zydus Wellness. He also served as chairman of an expert committee of Bihar State Health Society

He is the chairman of Mangaluru branch of Bharatiya Vidya Bhavan. He started a medical journal, Journal of the Science of Healing Outcomes and serves as its Editor-in-Chief. Hegde was a fellow of the National Academy of Medical Sciences till 2016.

B.M. Hegde is a part of the selection jury in Mahaveer Awards in Bhagwan Mahaveer Awards.
</ref>

Pseudoscience and controversies 

He has proposed that 'quantum healing' can bring sick persons back to normal, a concept widely regarded in the scientific community as pseudoscientific.

In 2019, when Hegde was invited to deliver a lecture on "Sauce of Happiness" at the campus of Indian Institute of Technology, Madras, he was called a proponent of "pseudo-science and quackery" by a group of research scholars, who questioned his criticism of modern medicine and accused him of promoting unverified treatments for various ailments. Hegde said it showed "how much the protesters knew about science."

Hegde has also written articles and given talks in support of homeopathy, regarded globally as a pseudoscience. Hegde argues that even if one thinks incorrectly that Homeopathy is a placebo, it is still important, as most modern medicine is worse than placebo.

Bibliography

References 

Indian surgeons
People from Udupi
Mangaloreans
1938 births
Living people
Recipients of the Padma Bhushan in medicine
Manipal Academy of Higher Education
Dr. B. C. Roy Award winners
University of Madras alumni
University of Lucknow alumni
Pseudoscience
Indian medical writers
Indian medical academics
20th-century Indian educational theorists
Fellows of the National Academy of Medical Sciences
20th-century Indian medical doctors
Medical doctors from Karnataka
Recipients of the Padma Vibhushan in medicine